Inner World may refer to:
 Inner world of thoughts and emotions
 Inner World (album), 2020 debut album by the 14th Dalai Lama
 Inner Worlds, 1976 album by the Mahavishnu Orchestra
 Inner Worlds (video game), 1996 video game
 Fictional world in the Spider Riders

See also
 In-World, location in the Dark Tower series by Stephen King
 Underworld (disambiguation)